Guelwaar is a 1993 French-Senegalese drama film written and directed by Ousmane Sembène. The name is borrowed from the Serer pre-colonial dynasty of Guelowar. The film won The President of the Italian Senate's Gold Medal at the 49th Venice International Film Festival.

Plot

A Catholic and a Muslim die the same day. Relatives of the Muslim went to claim his body for burial, but due to an administrative error they got the body of a Catholic Christian man whose family had to settle for an empty casket. The burial of a Christian man, a political activist and dissident, by a Muslim family sets off a conflagration of satire and comedy in a deeply religious community. The film, said to be based on a true story, is a biting drama about North-South power relations and socio-economic development, inter-religious communal tensions, African religion and African pride, with a nod to Thomas Sankara and pan-Africanism.

In a scene in the film, the lead actor who plays Guelwaar, Abou Camara, recites a verse about African pride and dignity from Kocc Barma Fall, the 17th-century Senegambian philosopher and lamane.

Cast
 Abou Camara as Guelwaar
 Marie Augustine Diatta
 Mame Ndoumbé Diop as Nogoy Marie Thioune
 Ndiawar Diop as Barthelemy
 Lamine Mane as Dibocor

Release
The film was slated for release in Senegal alongside the 1993 elections, but was blocked from being shown as it dealt with themes critical to Senegal's governmental policy regarding foreign aid.

Guelwaar was released theatrically in France by Les Films du Paradoxe in 1993. It received an American home video release with independent distributor New Yorker Films that same year, though it has been out of print since the company shut down in 2018.

See also
Guelowar (a Serer maternal dynasty)
 Cinema of Senegal

External links

References

1993 drama films
1993 films
Films directed by Ousmane Sembène
Films produced by Jacques Perrin
Films about the Serer people
French drama films
1990s French-language films
1990s French films